Lal Chintamani Sharan Nath Shahdeo (14 December 1931 – 10 July 2014),  was the last ruling Nagvanshi Maharaja of  Chotanagpur Zamindari estate and a politician.

Early life
Lal Chintamani Sharan Nath Shahdeo was born in the royal family of Nagvanshi dynasty in 1931. He studied at Raj Kumar College in Raipur. In 1950, he succeeded his great grandfather Udai Pratap Nath Shah Deo as the maharaj of Chotanagpur zamindari estate. He married Prem Manjari Devi, daughter of Raja Bhanuganga Tribhuban Deb, Raja of Bamra, and his wife, Rani Jyoti Manjari Devi in 1952. He had one son and four daughters. He was the last ruling maharaja till Zamindari was abolished in 1952.

Career
He was an Independent MLA from the Ranchi Assembly constituency in 1957 and was the youngest MLA in the Bihar Vidhan Sabha. Later, he was elected to the Bihar Legislative Council as a Congress candidate.

He was a member of South Eastern Railway Board, a life senator of Ranchi University and the chairman of Small Scale Industrial Board (Bihar). He helped in the establishment of many educational, health and government institutions by donating lands and lending financial support. Organisations thus established include Kartik Oraon College in Gumla, Maharani Prem Manjari Devi College for girls in Ratu, Adivasi Bal Vikas Vidyalaya in Ratu, Maharani Prem Manjari Devi Super Speciality Hospital in Ratu and Ratu police station among others.

Death
He died in Ranchi on 9 July 2014 following a brief illness.

References

2014 deaths
Indian royalty
Founders of Indian schools and colleges
1931 births
Bihar MLAs 1957–1962
Members of the Bihar Legislative Council
20th-century Indian philanthropists
People from Ranchi district
Nagpuria people